Wilhelm Ludwig Petermann (3 November 1806 Leipzig – 27 January 1855 Hanover), was a German botanist and agrostologist, professor of philosophy and botany, and curator of the Herbarium at the University of Leipzig.  He is commemorated in the botanical genus Petermannia F.Muell.

Selected publications

 1849. Deutschlands Flora mit Abbildungen sämmtlicher Gattungen auf 100 Tafeln
 1846. Analytischer Pflanzenschlssel für botanische Excursionen in der Umgegend von Leipzig (Excursiones botánicas con taxonomías analíticas en la vecindad de Leipzig)
 1845. Das Pflanzenreich in vollständigen Beschreibungen aller wichtigen Gewächse dargestellt ... durch naturgetreue Abbildungen erläutert. 282 pp.
 1841. Flora des Bienitz und seiner Umgebungen ... Mit einer Karte
 1840. Caroli Linnaei Opera. Editio prima critica, plena, ad editiones veras exacta, textum nullo rei detrimento contractum locosque editionum discrepantes exhibens. Vol. 1., Systema vegetabilium. Ed. Lipsiae, Sumptum fecit O. Wigand
 1838. Flora Lipsiensis excursoria, exhibens plantas phanerogamas circa Lipsiam tam sponte nascentes quam in agris cultas, simul cum arboribus et fruticibus pomerii Lipsiensis
 1835. Caroli Linnaei Opera. Editio prima critica, plena, ad editiones veras exacta, textum nullo rei detrimento contractum locosque editionum discrepantes exhibens. Vol. 2. Systema vegetabilium. Ed. Lipsiae, Sumptum fecit O. Wigand
 1835. De flore gramineo, adjectis graminum circa Lipsiam tam sponte nascentium quam in agris cultorum descriptionibus genericis. Dissertatio botanica
 De flore gramineo, adjectis graminum circa Lipsiam tam sponte nascentium quam in agris cultorum descriptionibus genericis. Dissertatio botanica
 Schlüssel der Gattungen nach dem künstlichen Systeme
 In Codicem Botanicum Linnaeanum Index Alphabeticus Generum Specierum Ac Synonymorum Omnium Completissimus
 Taschenbuch Der Botanik Leipzig, Volckmar. 1842

References

Botanical illustrators
19th-century German botanists
1806 births
1855 deaths
Scientists from Leipzig